Peștera Muierilor, or Peștera Muierii (Romanian for "The Women's Cave", or "The Woman's Cave"), is an elaborate cave system located in the Baia de Fier commune, Gorj County, Romania. It contains abundant cave bear remains, as well as a human skull. The skull is radiocarbon dated to 30,150 ± 800, indication an absolute age between 40,000 and 30,000 BP. It was uncovered in 1952. Alongside similar remains found in Cioclovina Cave (from ca. 29,000 BP), they are among the most ancient early modern humans in Romanian prehistory.

The human skull is that of a woman with obvious anatomically modern human traits, including a high forehead, small jaw and small supraorbital ridges. Despite the tall cranial vault, the occipital bone forms a distinct dome, a trait normally associated with Neanderthals. The largely intact facial bones indicate a woman with "rugged traits". This mosaic of features mirrors that seen in the Peștera cu Oase find, indicating possible Neanderthal admixture or generally robust (archaic) traits (or both). The early date makes the find referable to the early Cro-Magnon group of finds.

On the basis of radiocarbon dating and also the analysis of the archaeological context, some researchers advanced the hypothesis of the association of these bones with Cro-Magnons and the Aurignacian archaeological culture. Others mention the possibility that these findings could belong to a certain regional culture from the Southern Carpathians, from the period of the Final Middle Paleolithic and Early Upper Paleolithic.

DNA analysis
The remains of three individuals were found at the site. In a 2016 study, researchers extracted DNA from two upper molars from one of the three individuals, Peştera Muierii 1 (35,000 BP), and confirmed that the individual was a fully modern human; mtDNA analysis shows that  Peştera Muierii 1 comes from a previously unknown basal mtDNA Haplogroup U6* lineage. As Haplogroup U6 is today common in North Africa, researchers believe that the U6 lineage in North Africa was the result of migration from Western Asian back into North Africa. Researchers also extracted DNA from the temporal bone of Peştera Muierii 2 (33,000 BP). This individual also comes from basal mtDNA Haplogroup U6 and was confirmed as being a female.

See also 
 Peștera cu Oase
 Prehistoric Romania
 Prehistoric Transylvania
 Prehistoric Southeastern Europe
 Prehistoric Europe

References 

Upper Paleolithic Homo sapiens fossils
Caves of Romania
Archaeological sites in Romania
Prehistory of Southeastern Europe
Peopling of Europe